Line 2 of the Chengdu Metro is the second line on the metro network in Chengdu, Sichuan. Line 2 is a crosstown northwest-southeast trunk route. This line serves the Chengdu East railway station. Line 2 began operation on September 16, 2012. An 11 km long mostly elevated extension to Longquanyi began testing in April 2014 opened in October 2014.

Opening timeline

Stations

Est. Completion

References 

The information in this article is mostly based on that in its Chinese equivalent.

Chengdu Metro lines
Railway lines opened in 2012
2012 establishments in China